The Convention of Cintra (or Sintra) was an agreement signed on 30 August 1808, during the Peninsular War. By the agreement, the defeated French were allowed to evacuate their troops from Portugal without further conflict. The Convention was signed at the Palace of Queluz, in Queluz, Cintra, Estremadura.

The French forces under Jean-Andoche Junot were defeated by the Anglo-Portuguese forces commanded by Sir Arthur Wellesley at Vimeiro on 21 August and found themselves almost cut off from retreat. However, at that moment, Wellesley was superseded by the arrival of Sir Harry Burrard and then the next day by Sir Hew Dalrymple. Both were cautious old men who had seen little recent fighting; rather than push the French, they were satisfied to open negotiations. Wellesley had sought to take control of the Torres Vedras area high ground and cut the French retreat with his unused reserve, but he was ordered to hold. Talks between Dalrymple and François Kellerman led to the signing of the Convention.

Dalrymple allowed terms for Portugal similar to those a garrison might receive for surrendering a fortress. The 20,900 French soldiers were evacuated from Portugal with all their equipment and 'personal property' (which may have included looted Portuguese valuables) by the British Navy. They were transported to Rochefort, France. Junot arrived there on 11 October. Avoiding all Spanish entanglements and getting free transport meant the French travelled loaded, not light like a defeated garrison marching to their own lines.

The Convention was seen as a disgrace by many in the United Kingdom  who felt that a complete defeat of Junot had been transformed into a French escape, while Dalrymple had also ignored the Royal Navy's concern about a blockaded Russian squadron in Lisbon. The squadron was allowed to sail to Portsmouth, and eventually to return to Russia, despite the fact that Britain and Russia were at war. 

Wellesley wanted to fight, but he signed the preliminary Armistice under orders. He took no part in negotiating the Convention and did not sign it. Dalrymple's reports were written, however, to centre any criticism on Wellesley, who still held a ministerial post in the government. Wellesley was subsequently recalled from Portugal, together with Burrard and Dalrymple, to face an official inquiry. The inquiry was held in the Great Hall at the Royal Hospital Chelsea from 14 November to 27 December 1808. All three men were cleared; but while Wellesley soon returned to active duty in Portugal, Burrard and Dalrymple were quietly pushed into retirement and never saw active service again. Sir John Moore, commenting on the Inquiry, expressed the popular sentiment that "Sir Hew Dalrymple was confused and incapable beyond any man I ever saw head an army. The whole of his conduct then and since has proved him to be a very foolish man."

Lord Byron laments the Convention in his Childe Harold's Pilgrimage:
And ever since that martial synod met,
Britannia sickens, Cintra! at thy name;
And folks in office at the mention fret,
And fain would blush, if blush they could, for shame.
How will posterity the deed proclaim!
Will not our own and fellow-nations sneer,
To view these champions cheated of their fame,
By foes in fight o'erthrown, yet victors here,
Where Scorn her finger points, through many a coming year?

The Convention of Cintra is also the name of a pamphlet written by the future British Poet Laureate William Wordsworth in 1808; he also wrote a passionate sonnet that, in his own words, was "composed while the author was engaged in writing a tract occasioned by" the Convention, in which he laments the bondage felt by "suffering Spain".    Delays in publication meant that journalistic, and satirical, features of Wordsworth's prose have been overlooked.

References

Britannia Sickens, Michael Glover. Leo Cooper, London, 1970, .

External links
 Documents Pertaining to the Convention of Cintra 1808
 Inquiry into the Convention of Cintra

Cintra
1808 in Portugal
1808 in France
Cintra
Cintra, Convention of
Cintra, Convention of
France–Portugal relations
Peninsular War